Apam johol or apam daun rambai is a traditional food, a sweetened rice cake, in Negeri Sembilan, Malaysia. The food is wrapped in rambai leaves to preserve the aroma and to make it look good. It is sometimes eaten with rendang, sambal tumis and bean porridge. It is usually served during breakfast or teatime.

See also

 Cuisine of Malaysia

References

External links
 Apam Johol

Malay cuisine
Snack foods